Hawaii Five-O is an instrumental album by the Ventures. It is named for the popular 1968 television series, and featured the theme song from the series composed by Morton Stevens as its title track. It was released in 1969 on Liberty Records LST-8061 and reached #11 on the Billboard Top LP chart, staying for 24 weeks.  The album was certified gold by RIAA on July 21, 1971. The popularity of the album was propelled by the hit title track, which reached #4 on the Billboard Pop Singles chart.

Track listing

"Hawaii Five-O" (Morton Stevens) – 1:59
"Lovin' Things" (Jet Loring, Artie Schroeck) – 2:31
"Galveston" (Jimmy Webb, Al De Lory) – 2:40
"The Letter" (Wayne Carson Thompson, Dan Penn) – 2:10
"Don't Give in to Him" (Gary Usher) – 2:12
"Theme from A Summer Place" (Max Steiner, Percy Faith) – 2:16
"Medley: Spooky/Traces/Stormy" (Harry Middlebrooks, Mike Shapiro, Buddy Buie, James Cobb) – 4:25
"Medley: Aquarius/Let the Sunshine In" (Gerome Ragni, James Rado, Galt MacDermot, Bones Howe) – 2:49
"Games People Play" (Joe South) – 2:46
"I Can Hear Music" (Jeff Barry, Ellie Greenwich, Phil Spector) – 2:37
"Dizzy" (Tommy Roe, Fred Weller, Steve Barri) – 2:31

Personnel

Ventures
 Don Wilson – rhythm guitar
 Gerry McGee – lead guitar 
 Bob Bogle – bass, lead guitar
 Mel Taylor – drums

Technical
 Joe Saraceno – producer
 Lanky Linstrot – engineer 
 Mike Melvoin – arrangements
 Gabor Halmos – design
 Woody Woodward – art direction
 Jerry White – photography front cover
 Gerald Trafficanda – photography back cover

References

1969 albums
The Ventures albums
Liberty Records albums